Dungy can refer to:

Tony Dungy, football player and coach
Camille Dungy, poet
Dungy Head, a place